Christiana Mary Demain Hammond (6 August 186011 May 1900) was an English painter and illustrator. She was a member of the Cranford School of illustration, and illustrated reissues of classic English texts from the 19th century. Her illustrations were frequently found in Cassell's Magazine, the Quiver, and St. Paul's. She exhibited occasionally at the Royal Academy and Royal Institute of Painters in Watercolours.

Early life
Hammond Mary Demain Hammond was born in Coldharbour Lane, Brixton, London on 6 August 1860," and baptised on 16 September 1860. She was not named on her birth registration, but simply registered as a female child. Her parents were Horatio Demain Hammond (c. 183311 March 1900), a bankers clerk, and Eliza Wood (baptised 21 June 1836first quarter of 1882), who had married in St. George's, Bloomsbury, London on 5 May 1858.

The couple had three children, all of whom were artists:
Christiana Mary Demain (186011 May 1900)
Gertrude Ellen Demain  (baptised 6 July 186221 July 1951). Gertrude and Christiana trained together, first at the Lambeth School of Art and then at the Royal Academy Schools. She was a painter and illustrator like Hammond. Gertrude was a prolific illustrator of books, including children's books and the retelling of historical stories. Gertrude married Henry Going McMurdie (c. 186028 November 1948) in Fulham, London on 14 June 1898 and the couple lived with Hammond at 2 St. Paul's Studios, in what is now Talgath Road, Kensington.
Percy Edward Demain (6 December 18653 April 1946) was described himself as a stained-glass artist in the 1901 census and as a decorative artist in 1911 and 1939. In 1906 he was working as an artist for Crittall Manufacturing Company, famous for their involvement in the Art-Deco movement, both as suppliers of steel windows used in art deco buildings, and for commissioning buildings in the art deco style. He was described as a Poster Artist in 1907, suggesting that he was involved in advertising for Crittall. Percy married Martha Cantwell in Lambeth in the third quarter of 1904. The couple had at least one son, Seymour Edward Demain (baptised 7 July 190515 October 1948)
Christiana was the only one of her siblings who did not marry.

Education
Hammond received her first training in drawing from her Governess, and then attended the Lambeth School of Art with her sister Gertrude in 1879. At the Lambeth School, Hammond won the Cressy for the best sketch on a particular subject, a competition open to all the students at the school, with the award made by Sir Lawrence Alma-Tadema.

Hammond and her sister both won scholarships for three years tuition at the Royal Academy Schools, where they began in 1889. Here, Hammond distinguished herself by passing through the various schools almost as rapidly as was possible. However, she was not eligible for a second three year scholarship as, although she had passed all her exams, she had missed many lectures due to illness, and a good attendance record was a requirement for a further scholarship. Thus her artistic education ended three year earlier than she would have liked. It was this foreshortening of her education that led her to concentrate on pen and ink work rather than oil painting.

Works
Hammond painted, and exhibited at the Royal Academy in 1886, 1891, 1892, 1893, and 1894, and at the Royal Society of Painters in Watercolours in 1886 and 1895. While still a student at the Royal Academy Schools she came to the attention of James Barr, editor of the Detroit Free Press and Henry Reichardt, art-editor of Pick-Me-Up, both of whom gave her commissions. Hammond also contributed to the first issue of Reichardt's new illustrated weekly St. Paul's in 1884. After this first appearance of her work in St. Paul's she was approached not only by publishers such as Macmillan and Allen, but also by Sir William Ingram, the proprietor of both the Illustrated London News and The Sketch. From then on she was turning away work, as she was offered more commissions than she could complete.

She was also published in Cassell's Magazine, The Quiver, The English Illustrated Magazine, The Queen, Pall Mall Magazine, Pearson’s Magazine, The Idler, Madame, Good Words, The Ludgate Monthly, and The Temple Magazine

Hammond is regarded as a member of the Cranford School along with the C. E. Brock, H. M. Brock, Fred Pegram, F. H. Townsend and the inaugurator Hugh Thomson. The school was strictly speaking a shared style, as the individual artists had no particular relationship with each other. It was a style which celebrated a sentimental, pre-industrial notion of ‘old England’.

Books illustrated by Hammond
The following list is based on the list presented in the Argosy obituary. Most of the Hammond's work were for posthumous editions. However, in three cases she illustrated first editions.

Example of illustrations by Hammond
Illustration by Hammond for the 1898 Service & Patton reissue of Vanity Fair by Thackeray.

Death
Hammond died unexpectedly in the house she shared with her sister and brother-in-law on 11 May 1900, aged 39. Her father has died only two months previously. Her estate was valued at £2,198 2s. Her brother Percy acted as her executor.

Assessment
Forman in her Argosy obituary stated that no competent critic would deny her a place among the foremost six of her contemporaries, and that others, of no less competence, would unhesitatingly rank her among the foremost three. and that Fancy, delicacy, vigour, variety, subtlety of characterisation, distinction in both conception and execution were all in rich measure at Miss Hammond's command.
 
Thorpe noted that Hammond's delicate and charming pen-drawings were very popular and that she had a long list of books to her credit. However, he also considered that many of her figuresparticularly the womenwere spoilt by disproportionately small heads, and her sister was the more skilful draftsman. Hammond and her sister in the 1890's were at that time certainly the most distinguished members of their sex in the field of illustration. Peppin concurs with Thorpe's assessment that Gertrude was the better draftsman.

Houfe notes that Hammond's penwork is rather free and she excels in costume subjects in a style not unlike that of the Brocks' eighteenth century pastiches. Loosey notes that Hammond was the first identifiably female illustrator of Jane Austen’s novels, illustrating three Austen titles for two publishers. And that when compared with other members of the Cranford School, Hammond’s Austen illustrations are on the whole more serious, less whimsical, and more visually surprising than Thomson’s or the Brocks’. Southam calls Hammond the finest artist of this period and states that her decisive and characterized pen-and-ink drawings are neither whimsical nor over decorative.

Cooke states that Hammond's contribution to the Cranford School's escapist discourse of a sentimental pre-industrial Old England was simple but effective. Though representing her characters with historical exactitude, her main focus is on small nuances of facial expression and gesture. This makes her an ideal illustrator for Jane Austen. Cooke summarised by saying that Catering for a large bourgeois audience, her refined and perceptive illustrations had a wide currency, only supplanted by the growing taste for the radicalism of English Art Nouveau.

Notes

References

External links

St Paul's Studios where Hammond worked and died, on Google Street View.
Books illustrated by Hammond online at the British Library.
Books illustrated by Hammond online at the Hathi Trust

1860 births
1900 deaths
19th-century British painters
19th-century British women artists
Alumni of the City and Guilds of London Art School
Alumni of the Royal Academy Schools
Artists from London
British illustrators
British women illustrators
British women painters
People from Brixton
Sibling artists